The U.S. House Committee on Agriculture, or Agriculture Committee is a standing committee of the United States House of Representatives. The House Committee on Agriculture has general jurisdiction over federal agriculture policy and oversight of some federal agencies, and it can recommend funding appropriations for various governmental agencies, programs, and activities, as defined by House rules.

History of the committee
The Agriculture Committee was created on May 3, 1820, after Lewis Williams of North Carolina sponsored a resolution to create the committee and give agricultural issues equal weight with commercial and manufacturing interests.  The committee originally consisted of seven members, from the states of Maryland, New Hampshire, New York, Pennsylvania, South Carolina, Vermont, and Virginia.  Thomas Forrest of Pennsylvania was the first chairman.  The Agriculture Committee remained a seven-member body until 1835, when two more members were added.  It was not until 1871 that the next two members were added.  Since then it has gradually grown to its current size of 46 members.

The U.S. Senate counterpart to the House Agriculture Committee, the U.S. Senate Committee on Agriculture, Nutrition and Forestry, was created on December 9, 1825.

Role of the committee
The Agriculture Committee is not generally considered to be a particularly powerful one.  However, it is an important committee to be on for Representatives from many rural areas where agriculture is the main industry.  The committee has jurisdiction over agriculture, forestry, nutrition, water conservation, and other agriculture-related fields.

Jurisdiction

As prescribed by House Rules, the Committee on Agriculture's jurisdiction includes the following:

 Adulteration of seeds, insect pests, and protection of birds and animals in forest reserves
 Agriculture generally
 Agricultural and industrial chemistry
 Agricultural colleges and experiment stations
 Agricultural economics and research
 Agricultural education extension services
 Agricultural production, marketing and stabilization of prices of agricultural products, and commodities (excluding foreign distribution)
 Animal industry and diseases of animals
 Commodity exchanges
 Crop insurance and soil conservation
 Dairy industry
 Entomology and plant quarantine
 Extension of farm credit and farm security
 Inspection of livestock, poultry, meat products, and seafood and seafood products
 Forestry in general and forest reserves other than those created from the public domain
 Human nutrition and home economics
 Plant industry, soils, and agricultural engineering
 Rural electrification
 Rural developments
 Water conservation related to activities of the Department of Agriculture

Members, 118th Congress 

Resolutions electing members:  (Chair),  (Ranking Member),  (D),  (R),  (D),  (R),  (D)

Subcommittees

Historical membership rosters

115th Congress

116th Congress

Subcommittees

117th Congress 

Resolutions electing members:  (Chair),  (Ranking Member),  (D),  (R),  (D),  (D),  (D),  (R),  (D),  (D),  (R),  (R)
Subcommittees

Subcommittees

List of chairs

Notes

References

See also
 List of current United States House of Representatives committees

External links

Agriculture Committee Homepage, official website (Archive)
Committee Rules (PDF), Agriculture Committee, official website
House Agriculture Committee. Legislation activity and reports, Congress.gov.
House Agriculture Committee Hearings and Meetings Video. Congress.gov
Past Committee Chairs, Agriculture Committee, official website

Agriculture
House Committee on Agriculture
1820 establishments in Washington, D.C.